746 Naval Air Squadron (746 NAS) was a Naval Air Squadron of the Royal Navy's Fleet Air Arm. It was active from 1942 through to 1946, formed as a Night Fighter Interception Unit at RNAS Lee-on-Solent (HMS Daedalus). It operated out of various Royal Navy and Royal Air Force air bases, along with some deployments on Royal Navy escort aircraft carriers.

History of 746 NAS

Night Fighter Interception Unit (1942 - 1946)

746 Naval Air Squadron formed at RNAS Lee-on-Solent (HMS Daedalus), situated near Lee-on-the-Solent in Hampshire, approximately four miles west of Portsmouth, on 23 November 1942 as a Night Fighter Interception Unit. Almost immediately, on the 1 December 1942, the squadron moved to RAF Ford, located at Ford, in West Sussex, England. The squadron was initially equipped with the Night Fighter variant of the Fairey Fulmar, the NF Mk.II and its allocation of these aircraft also included the Target Tug ability. Later on, 746 NAS operated the Fairey Firefly Night Fighter version, the Firefly NF Mk. II. The squadron moved from RAF Ford to RAF Wittering, a Royal Air Force station within the area of Peterborough, Cambridgeshire and North Northamptonshire, on the 3 April 1944.

Around six months later, on the 1 October 1944, it returned to Ford, now controlled by the Admiralty and known as RNAS Ford (HMS Peregrine), where it then participated in six separate aircraft carrier deployments, during the first four months of 1945. From the 5 to the 12 January 1945, 'A' Flight from 746 NAS, was deployed on the Ruler-class escort carrier, HMS Smiter (D55), operating with Fairey Firefly NF.II. 'A' Flight then spent two days, 25 and 26 January 1945, operating from the Attacker-class escort carrier, HMS Ravager (D70), again with Fairey Firefly NF.II. In February 1945, 'A' Flight spent one week, from the 17 to the 23, deployed to the Ruler-class escort carrier, HMS Premier (D23), again operating the Firefly Night Fighter variant. March saw an approximately two week operation, aboard the Ruler-class escort carrier, HMS Searcher (D40), for 'A' Flight. As on previous deployments, the Night Fighter mark of Firefly was used, this took place from 14 to the 30 of the month. 746 NAS 'A' Flight returned to HMS Searcher on the 5 April remaining on board, with the Firefly Night Fighter, until the 13 April, including an overlap at the end of the deployment with a brief return to HMS Premier for two days, 12 and 13 April.

The squadron assisted in carrying out development and trials on radar interception, for use in Naval aircraft. It disbanded on 30 January 1946, being absorbed by 787 Naval Air Squadron.

Aircraft flown

The squadron has flown a number of different aircraft types, including:
Fairey Fulmar NF Mk.II (1942-1943)
Fairey Fulmar TT Mk.II (1942-1943)
Fairey Firefly NF.Mk II (May 1943-Jan 1946)
Fairey Firefly NF.Mk I
Grumman Hellcat N.F. MkII
Supermarine Seafire F Mk XVII

Fleet Air Arm / Royal Air Force Bases 
746 NAS operated from a number of air bases:
Royal Naval Air Station LEE-ON-SOLENT (23 November 1942 - 1 December 1942)
Royal Air Force Ford (1 December 1942 - 3 April 1944)
Royal Air Force Wittering (3 April 1944 - 1 October 1944)
R. N. Air Section FORD (1 October 1944 - 23 August 1945)
Royal Air Force West Raynham (23 August 1945 - 30 January 1946)

Commanders
746 NAS had two commanding officers during its active period.
 Maj L.A. Harris, OBE DSC RM (Nov 1942 - Mar 1945)
 Lt-Cdr G.L. Davies, DSC RNVR (Mar 1945 - Jan 1946)

References

Citations

Bibliography

700 series Fleet Air Arm squadrons
Military units and formations established in 1942
Military units and formations of the Royal Navy in World War II